Frascarelli is an Italian surname. Notable people with the surname include:

Andrei Frascarelli (born 1973), Brazilian footballer
Damián Frascarelli (born 1985), Uruguayan footballer
Giuseppe Frascarelli ( 1923–2004), Italian footballer
Leonida Frascarelli (1906–1991), Italian cyclist

Italian-language surnames